The 2015 SABA Championship was the 4th SABA Championship, and the qualifying event in the SABA subzone, one of the FIBA Asia's subzone for the 2015 FIBA Asia Championship. The games were held from 3 July to 5 July in Bengaluru, India. The tournament was originally set to be hosted in Bangladesh.

India successfully defended their title by sweeping the entire tournament. Winning their third overall SABA Championship title, they also got the only slot for South Asia subzone en route to the 2015 FIBA Asia Championship. Sri Lanka finished second and Nepal ended third, wherein they improved their finishes in this edition compared to their positions in the 2014 SABA Championship.

On 13 June, the Indian Ministry of Sports called for all basketball tournaments in India including the SABA Championship to be put on hold following a leadership dispute at the Indian Basketball Federation. By 28 June, the faction led by K. Govindraj, which has been approved by FIBA, secured a court order from the Karnataka High Court to host the tournament as planned.

Venue
The Kanteerava Indoor Stadium is set to host the games.

Standings

Results

Final rankings

Awards

References

2015
2015–16 in Asian basketball
2015 in Indian sport
International basketball competitions hosted by India